The  was a class of oceanographic research ship/weather ship of the Imperial Japanese Navy (IJN), serving during World War II.

Construction
In 1938, the IJN wanted to investigate the weather and ocean currents in a potential future battlefield. Kaiyō No. 1-class ships were built for the purpose. The IJN made Hokkaido Fisheries Research Institute San'yō Maru a sample for the Kaiyō No. 1. All ships were deployed in the Hydrographic Department, and they were directly controlled by the Naval Ministry. Therefore, being government ships, they raised civil ensign, not the naval ensign. The crew were civil servants except for several warrant officers.

All sister ships were built by Mitsubishi Heavy Industries at Shimonoseki shipyard.

Ships in classes

See also
Ministry of the Navy of Japan

References

Further reading
Monthly Ships of the World No.613, Special issue "All ships of Japan Coast Guard 1948–2003", (Japan), July 2003
Jirō Kimata, Introductory book of the Japanese small vessels, Kōjinsha (Japan), December 1999
30 year History of Japan Maritime Safety Agency, Policy and Legal Affairs Division-Japan Maritime Safety Agency (JMSA), May 1979
75 year History of Mitsubishi Heavy Industries-Shimonoseki shipyard, Mitsubishi Heavy Industries-Shimonoseki shipyard, 1964
Shizuo Fukui, FUKUI SHIZUO COLLECTION "Japanese Naval Vessels 1869–1945", KK Bestsellers (Japan), December 1994
, National Archives of Japan
Reference code: C08011043700, Ships and boats list
Reference code: C08030773600, Data relevant to Daiichi-Kaiyo-maru (No.1) and Daini-Kaiyo-maru (No.2), October 1944

World War II naval ships of Japan
Auxiliary ships of the Imperial Japanese Navy
Japan Coast Guard
Research vessels of Japan
Survey ships
Weather ships
Ships built by Mitsubishi Heavy Industries
Ships lost with all hands
Maritime incidents in 1952
Shipwrecks in the Pacific Ocean
Auxiliary research ship classes